National Route 58 is a national highway in South Korea connects Changwon to Cheongdo County. It was established on 25 August 2001.

Main stopovers
 South Gyeongsang Province
 Jinhae District, Changwon
 Busan
 Gangseo District
 South Gyeongsang Province
 Gimhae - Miryang
 North Gyeongsang Province
 Cheongdo County

Major intersections

 (■): Motorway
IS: Intersection, IC: Interchange

South Gyeongsang Province·Busan

North Gyeongsang Province

References

58
Roads in South Gyeongsang
Roads in Busan
Roads in North Gyeongsang